George Taylor House may refer to:

 George W. Taylor House, Le Sueur, Minnesota, listed on the National Register of Historic Places (NRHP) in Minnesota
 George Taylor House (Freehold Borough, New Jersey), listed on the NRHP in New Jersey
 George Taylor House (Corvallis, Oregon), NRHP-listed
 George Taylor House (Catasauqua, Pennsylvania), a U.S. National Historic Landmark
 George Taylor Jr. House, Provo, Utah, NRHP-listed